Jean Klein may refer to:

 Jean Klein (footballer) (born 1942), Luxembourgian footballer
 Jean Klein (rower) (born 1944), French rower
 Jean Klein (spiritual teacher) (1912–1998), French spiritual teacher

See also
 Eugene Klein (disambiguation)